Elizabeth Drayson is Lorna Close Fellow in Spanish at Murray Edwards College, University of Cambridge. She is a specialist in medieval and early modern Spanish literature and cultural history. She produced the first translation and edition of Juan Ruiz's Libro de buen amor to appear in England.

Selected publications
 The Book of Good Love, Juan Ruiz, Archpriest of Hita, new English translation and critical introduction, notes and bibliography, Everyman Paperbacks, (London: Orion, 1999).
 The King and the Whore: King Roderick and La Cava, The New Middle Ages series (New York and Basingstoke: Palgrave MacMillan, 2007). Shortlisted for the La Corónica book prize 2008.
 The Lead Books of Granada, Early Modern History: Society and Culture series (New York and Basingstoke: Palgrave MacMillan, 2013).
 The Moor's Last Stand. Profile, 2017.

References

External links 
https://twitter.com/Withburga

Fellows of Murray Edwards College, Cambridge
Living people
Year of birth missing (living people)
Alumni of the University of Cambridge
Cultural historians
Historians of Spanish literature
British women non-fiction writers